Olav Tuelo Johannesen (born 23 February 1984) is a Norwegian footballer who plays as a forward. He also holds citizenship of Botswana. He was born to a Motswana mother and a Norwegian father.

Club career
Tuelo Johannesen started his career at Larvik Turn as a youth player.

In 2003, he made a transfer to Sandefjord, and he made his Tippeligaen debut in the scoreless draw against Stabæk on 9 April 2006.

During his period in Sandefjord, he was loaned out to Bodø/Glimt (2005–2006) and HamKam (2006–2007).

In 2007 Olav made a transfer to Kongsvinger. He played 105 matches for the club.

On 1 August 2011 he was signed by IK Start until the end of the season.

Career statistics

References

External links
Profile at KIL.no

1984 births
Living people
People from Larvik
Norwegian footballers
Association football forwards
Larvik Turn players
Sandefjord Fotball players
FK Bodø/Glimt players
Hamarkameratene players
Kongsvinger IL Toppfotball players
IK Start players
Norwegian First Division players
Eliteserien players
Norway youth international footballers
Norwegian people of Botswana descent
Sportspeople from Vestfold og Telemark